Teldenia niveata is a moth in the family Drepanidae. It was described by Pagenstecher in 1896. It is found on Sulawesi.

References

Moths described in 1896
Drepaninae